Robert "Rob" Lloyd (born 3 April 1978) is an Australian actor/comedian who was the host of the RMITV flagship program Live on Bowen for the first two seasons. He was the host, co-writer and producer of The Mutant Way, which won several 2010 Antenna Awards. Rob also has a Doctor Who themed stage show called Who, Me that has had sell-out seasons at the 2011 Melbourne Fringe Festival, the 2011 Armageddon convention (Melbourne), the 2012 Adelaide Fringe Festival, and the 2012 Melbourne International Comedy Festival. In 2013 Lloyd toured Who, Me to Edinburgh Fringe Festival. In 2014 Lloyd teamed up with RiAus in association with BBC Worldwide Australia/New Zealand to host The Science of Doctor Who which toured nationally  during April, May and June.

References

External links
 
 

Living people
Australian television talk show hosts
Australian male comedians
1978 births
RMITV alumni